Pterophorus ebbei is a moth of the family Pterophoridae. It is known from New Guinea.

References

External links
Papua Insects

ebbei
Moths described in 1989